Pickhill railway station served the village of Pickhill, North Yorkshire, England from 1875 to 1959 on the Leeds-Northallerton Railway.

History 
The station opened in March 1875 (the first appearance in the Bradshaw timetable) by the North Eastern Railway. It was situated on the east side of the junction of Cross Lane and an unnamed minor road. Like Newby Wiske, the station initially had one low platform, but another was added when the line was doubled in 1901. There were no goods facilities at the station but there was a siding to the north serving the gravel quarry. The station was closed completely on 14 September 1959. The siding remained in use until 11 November 1963.

References

External links 

Former North Eastern Railway (UK) stations
Railway stations in Great Britain opened in 1875
Railway stations in Great Britain closed in 1959
1875 establishments in England
1959 disestablishments in England